The International Meteorological Organization Prize is awarded annually by the World Meteorological Organization (WMO) for outstanding contributions in the field of meteorology and, since 1971, the field of operational hydrology.

The prize, established in 1956, consists of a 14-carat gold medal 57mm in diameter, displaying the official WMO emblem and on the reverse the Latin inscription Pro singulari erga scientiam meteorologicam merito (for outstanding work on the science of meteorology), together with a cash award of 10,000 Swiss Francs. It was named to commemorate the International Meteorological Organization, the predecessor organisation of the current World Meteorological Organization.

Prizewinners
Source: WMO

See also

 List of oceanography awards
 List of meteorology awards
 List of prizes named after people
 List of prizes known as the Nobel of a field

References

Meteorology awards
Oceanography awards
Awards established in 1956